Scorned and Swindled is a 1984 American TV film directed by Paul Wendkos. The film score was composed by Billy Goldenberg. The film was based on a true story.

Cast
Tuesday Weld
Peter Coyote
Keith Carradine
Sheree North
Fionnula Flanagan

Reception
The New York Times called it "a fascinating slice of Americana on the seamier side... This is a strange, rather offbeat exercise for a television movie. There is no uplifting ending. There is no inspirational message. There is only the unsettling smell of vaguely unpleasant realities. Paul Wendkos directs with an unerring ability to make the decidedly bizarre seem almost comfortably commonplace. The performances are quite good, and Miss Weld is even more than that."

References

External links
Scorned and Swindled at Letterbox DVD
Scorned and Swindled at BFI
Scorned and Swindled at IMDb

1984 films
1984 television films
American television films
Films scored by Billy Goldenberg
Films directed by Paul Wendkos